Vietnamese Council may refer to:

 Council of Ministers, Government of Vietnam (1980–1992)
 Council of State, former name (1980–1992) of the Standing Committee of the National Assembly, the highest standing body of the National Assembly of Vietnam